The Best of Philip Bailey: A Gospel Collection is a  gospel compilation album by Philip Bailey which was released in 1991 by Word Records.

Critical reception

Lynn Van Matre of the Chicago Tribune gave a 3 out of 4 stars rating saying "The emphasis here is on lavishly produced, uptempo contemporary gospel songs with an unabashedly slick, pop feel-you could even dance to a lot of them. Bailey's silky, seductive falsetto is as appealing as ever, and the mood is joyfully uplifting throughout." 
With a 4 out of 5 stars rating William Rhulmann of Allmusic wrote "Bailey brings the same creamy pop production and warm falsetto singing to his inspirational work that he does to his solo albums and to Earth, Wind & Fire, although he is far gentler here (except when he's being religiously righteous on "Call To War")."

Track listing

Credits 
 Philip Bailey     –	Producer
 Steve Hall            –	Remastering
 Rev. Oliver W. Wells  –	Producer

References 

Philip Bailey albums
1991 greatest hits albums
Word Records albums
Albums produced by Philip Bailey